A. Wallace Hood (February 11, 1935 – April 28, 2017) was an American football  coach. A graduate of Ohio Wesleyan University, he served as the head football coach at Ohio Northern University in Ada, Ohio from 1974 to 1981, Fairmont State University in Fairmont, West Virginia from 1984 to 1991, and Otterbein University from 1995 to 2000, compiling a career college football coaching record of 112–112–8.

Head coaching record

College

References

1935 births
2017 deaths
Baldwin Wallace Yellow Jackets football coaches
Colgate Raiders football coaches
Fairmont State Fighting Falcons football coaches
Ohio Northern Polar Bears football coaches
Ohio Wesleyan Battling Bishops football players
Otterbein Cardinals football coaches
Kent State University alumni
High school baseball coaches in the United States
High school football coaches in Ohio
Sportspeople from Cleveland
People from Mentor, Ohio
Players of American football from Cleveland